The 1901 SAFA Grand Final was the concluding championship match of the 1901 SAFA season. The game resulted in a victory for  who beat  by four points.

References

SAFA Grand Final, 1901
October 1901 events